Osborne School may refer to:
Osborne School (Lake Worth, Florida), listed on the National Register of Historic Places in Palm Beach County, Florida
Osborne School (Sandusky, Ohio), listed on the National Register of Historic Places in Erie County, Ohio
Osborne School, Winchester, a special school in Winchester, England